20th FFCC Awards
December 23, 2015

Best Picture:
Mad Max: Fury Road

The 20th Florida Film Critics Circle Awards were held on December 23, 2015.

The nominations were announced on December 21, 2015, led by Carol with eight nominations.

Winners and nominees

Winners are listed at the top of each list in bold, while the runner-ups for each category are listed under them.

References

External links
 

2015 film awards
2010s